Fire Over Rome is a 1965 Italian peplum film directed by Guido Malatesta.

Plot
After successfully campaigning in Gaul for several years, Consul Marcus Valerius arrived back in Rome with his legion. He and his men were looking forward to celebrating their return with their families and friends. The fearless warrior expected his Emperor to be pleased with his conquests, but Nero showed little interest. Other priorities were far more important.
Nero ordered Marcus to assist Menecrate, the hated leader of the Praetorian Guards, in cleansing the city of its Christian presence but he refused and resigned as Consul in protest. He was immediately sentenced to death and his legion disbanded. 
Marcus Valerius is a valiant soldier and the killing of innocent people goes against all his principles. The former hero is now the hunted.

Cast
 Lang Jeffries	as 	Marcus Valerius
 Cristina Gaioni	as 	Giulia
 Moira Orfei	as 	Poppaea
 Mario Feliciani	as 	Seneca
 Luciano Marin	as 	Fulvius
 Evi Maltagliati	as 	Livia Augusta, Marcus's Mother
 Franco Fantasia	as 	Clodius

Release
Fire Over Rome was released as Il incendio di Roma in Italy on 20 March 1965.

See also
 List of Italian films of 1965

References

Bibliography

External links

Fire Over Rome at Variety Distribution

1965 films
1960s Italian-language films
Peplum films
Films directed by Guido Malatesta
Films set in the Roman Empire
Films about gladiatorial combat
Depictions of Nero on film
Cultural depictions of Seneca the Younger
Cultural depictions of Poppaea Sabina
Sword and sandal films
1960s Italian films